KUA is the IATA code for Sultan Haji Ahmad Shah Airport, an airport in Malaysia.

KUA or Kua may also refer to:
 Kimball Union Academy, boarding school in the U.S. state of New Hampshire
 Kissimmee Utility Authority, electrical utility in Osceola County, Florida, U.S.
 Kua or Tshwa language, a dialect of East Kalahari Khoe used in Botswana and Zimbabwe
 Kwanyama dialect's ISO 839-3 code, a dialect of the Ovambo language used in Angola and Namibia
 South Campus (University of Copenhagen), also known as KUA (Københavns Universitet Amager)

See also
 KVA (disambiguation)